Emilko Janković (born 27 March 1984 in Banja Luka) is a Bosnian-Herzegovinian football defender who last played as a defender for NK Karlovac in the Croatian Prva HNL.

Club career
Janković previously played for FK Kozara Gradiška and FK Borac Banja Luka. He first went abroad to play for Panachaiki 2005 F.C. in the Greek Beta Ethniki. He also played with NK Segesta and NK Inter Zaprešić in Croatia.

References

1984 births
Living people
Sportspeople from Banja Luka
Association football defenders
Bosnia and Herzegovina footballers
FK Borac Banja Luka players
FK Kozara Gradiška players
Panachaiki F.C. players
HNK Segesta players
NK Inter Zaprešić players
NK Lučko players
NK Karlovac players
FK Rudar Prijedor players
FK Sloboda Tuzla players
NK Vinogradar players
NK Zelina players
Football League (Greece) players
Premier League of Bosnia and Herzegovina players
Croatian Football League players
First Football League (Croatia) players
Bosnia and Herzegovina expatriate footballers
Expatriate footballers in Greece
Bosnia and Herzegovina expatriate sportspeople in Greece
Expatriate footballers in Croatia
Bosnia and Herzegovina expatriate sportspeople in Croatia